The Anderson executive council was the 17th executive council of British Ceylon. The government was led by Governor John Anderson.

Executive council members

See also
 Cabinet of Sri Lanka

References

1916 establishments in Ceylon
1918 disestablishments in Ceylon
Cabinets established in 1916
Cabinets disestablished in 1918
Ceylonese executive councils
Ministries of George V